Detour is a Canadian thriller film, directed by Sylvain Guy and released in 2009. The film stars Luc Picard as Léo Huff, an assistant to a wealthy businesswoman who is travelling to Le Bic, Quebec to attend a meeting on his employer's proposal to build a tourist attraction in Bic National Park when he meets Lou (Isabelle Guérard), a young woman who needs his help liberating herself from her abusive boyfriend Roch (Guillaume Lemay-Thivierge).

The film opened commercially on September 18, 2009.

Guérard received a Jutra Award nomination for Best Actress at the 12th Jutra Awards in 2010.

References

External links

2009 films
2009 thriller films
Canadian thriller films
Quebec films
French-language Canadian films
2000s Canadian films